John Jane may refer to:
 John A. Jane, American neurosurgeon
 Fred T. Jane (John Fredrick Thomas Jane), founding editor of reference books on warships and aircraft